Benjamin House, also known as the Benjamin (John Forbes) House and Vesper Place, is a historic home located at Shelbina, Shelby County, Missouri.  It was built in 1872–1873, and is a three-story, Italian Villa brick dwelling over a full basement.  It measures 35 feet wide by 60 feet deep and has three porches.  It features a low-pitched hip roof, topped by a cupola and cast iron, bracketed canopies on the windows.

It was listed on the National Register of Historic Places in 1972.

References

Houses on the National Register of Historic Places in Missouri
Italianate architecture in Missouri
Houses completed in 1873
Buildings and structures in Shelby County, Missouri
National Register of Historic Places in Shelby County, Missouri